Emelie Mathilda Viktoria Lundberg (born 10 March 1993) is a Swedish football goalkeeper.

Honours 
Eskilstuna United DFF
Runner-up
 Damallsvenskan: 2015

External links 
 
 
 
 

1993 births
Living people
Swedish women's footballers
Mallbackens IF players
KIF Örebro DFF players
Eskilstuna United DFF players
Damallsvenskan players
Women's association football goalkeepers
People from Eskilstuna
Sportspeople from Södermanland County
Sweden women's youth international footballers
UEFA Women's Euro 2017 players